Casa Zimbabwe, commonly referred to as CZ, is a student housing cooperative in Berkeley, California housing 124 residents. It is the second largest non-apartment style unit of the  Berkeley Student Cooperative (BSC), behind Cloyne Court Hotel. Opened in 1966, it was one of the first co-ed student housing in the nation, as well as the first building intentionally built as a co-op.

Located at 2422 Ridge Road, CZ is a block from the center of the northern edge of the University of California, Berkeley campus. It sits on Northside atop Holy Hill, the area in the vicinity of a five-way intersection surrounded on all sides by churches and seminaries, such as Graduate Theological Union. Joined at the hip with the Ridge House, the building overlooks the North Gate of the university, and its two accessible roofs provide a view of San Francisco, East Bay, Berkeley Hills, and most of the university. BSC office and central kitchen are located in the same building.

History
While every other BSC house was a preexisting structure eventually converted into a co-op, in 1966 the Ridge Project, now Casa Zimbabwe, was built with the intent of a housing a living space, BCS office and the badly needed large kitchen and warehouse. A University Student Cooperative Association (now BCS) fund raising pamphlet stated that: The one abiding principle in the whole architectural design of Ridge Project has been to build a unit reflecting individuality and freedom, the antithesis of many dormitories. The disadvantages of other dorms, uniformity, regimentation of activities and general impersonality of buildings, have been avoided. The Ridge Project actively promotes diversity, freedom and variety of activities, and a small-scale residential environment.Planning for the new project began in the late fifties with the BCS raising approximately $650,000 of the $1,500,000 needed to build it. The largest portion of that amount was provided by various foundations grants, in addition BCS received approximately $100,000 from co-op alumni, $35,000 from co-op members and $30,000 from university faculty.

While as a whole the Ridge Project was coed, it had separate male and female wings and a large common area in between. There would be no restrictions on when or where a member of the house could be unless such rules where passed by the members themselves. One of the first approved motions was to switch members of a floor in the women's wing with a floor from the men's. Segregation of the wings by gender was over by mid 1970s. Casa Zimbabwe's "party house" reputation originated at the Ridge Project almost right after it opened. Across the bay from San Francisco its members where at the center of then blossoming hippie movement. Similarly, the political activity present today was even more so during the same years as a large portion of the members where also participating in the Free Speech Movement that originated in Berkeley several years earlier. In 1983, several members petitioned to change house's name to "Casa Zimbabwe." Some felt that the term "project" had a negative association with public housing and that there was a frequent confusion between the names of the Ridge Project and the Ridge House next to it. The name "Casa Zimbabwe" was a reference to independence of South Rhodesia from British rule and creation of Republic of Zimbabwe. Changing the name failed several times before getting approved in 1987.

Every house in BCS has mural painted on its walls, this is especially true in CZ where almost all of the public walls are painted. However, these were white until the late '70s. According to member folklore the album cover of Pink Floyd's Dark Side of The Moon was the first one painted. By 1990s almost half the walls were covered with art. Many murals had to be removed due to a seismic retrofitting in the spring of 2007. In the early Spring of the 2020 COVID-19 pandemic CZ instituted a self quarantine and no visitors policy, there were approximately 50 members living in the house during that period.

Members
The residents and boarders of CZ are the members of the cooperative, with fee of approximately $7,700 for 2020 academic school year, covering full room and board. Like in other houses each member is required to provide a five-hour work shift. Council meetings are held every week, members gather to discuss house business with decisions made through majority votes. Members of CZ often refer to themselves as "Czars."

Design and construction

While other BSC houses were preexisting structures, like apartment buildings and hotels, Casa Zimbabwe is unique in that it was built with intent of being used as a cooperative living space. CZ's east wing is four stories high and west wing is three, the two wings were offset by half a floor with the intention of making the house look less like a formal college dormitory. The BCS administrative office is in a separate part of the building, its connected at the hip to the older Ridge House. East and west wings are the living spaces, with the two wings being connected by two stories of wide common space. Many of the rooms provide sweeping views of San Francisco, East Bay, Berkeley Hills, and most of the university. A court yard lays in between Ridge house, administrative section and the east and west wings. Both of the wings' roofs are also common spaces. Forty solar panels were added to them in 1979 to supply hot water. CZ was temporary closed for seismic retrofitting in the spring of 2007. An elevator was also installed to make the building wheelchair accessible.

Notes

References

External links
Barrington Collective's Casa-Z page on archive.org
Casa Zimbabwe at the BSC home site
The Green Book A Collection of U.S.C.A. History by Guy Lillian and Krista Gasper 1971, 2002, 2006

History of Berkeley, California
Student housing cooperatives in the United States
Cooperatives in the San Francisco Bay Area
Buildings and structures in Berkeley, California
Berkeley Student Cooperative
1966 establishments in California
Residential buildings in Alameda County, California